My Street (Spanish:Mi calle) is a 1960 Spanish drama film written and directed by Edgar Neville.

Cast
Tota Alba
Rafael Alonso as Pablo López
Ángel Álvarez
Mariano Azaña
Rafael Bardem
Héctor Bianciotti
Roberto Camardiel
Susana Campos
Lina Canalejas
Antonio Casal as Lesmes
Carlos Casaravilla
Ana María Custodio
Julia Delgado Caro
Ángel del Pozo
María del Puy
Agustín González as Fabricio
María Isbert as Reme (as Maruja Isbert)
Katia Loritz as Carmela
Adolfo Marsillach as Gonzalo
Antonio Martínez
Nati Mistral
Conchita Montes as Julia
Gracita Morales as Purita
Pedro Porcel
George Rigaud (as Jorge Rigaud)
Cándido Rodríguez
Fernando Sanclemente
Antonio Vela as Gonzalito

References

Bibliography
 Mira, Alberto. The A to Z of Spanish Cinema. Rowman & Littlefield, 2010.

External links
 

1960 films
1960 drama films
1960s Spanish-language films
Spanish black-and-white films
Spain in fiction
Madrid in fiction
Spanish Civil War films
Films directed by Edgar Neville
1960s Spanish films